Simiolus: Netherlands Quarterly for the History of Art is a Dutch academic journal that publishes articles in English on art and art history, especially Dutch and Flemish art from the fifteenth to the seventeenth century. The journal was founded in 1966 at Utrecht University and appears quarterly, now courtesy of the Stichting Nederlandse Kunsthistorische Publicaties.

External links
Simiolus website

Art history journals
Publications established in 1966